Robert Crawford (29 October 1868 – 13 January 1930) was an Australian poet.

Early life and career 
Crawford was born in Doonside, New South Wales, the son of Robert Crawford senior, and was educated at The King's School, Parramatta, and the University of Sydney. Crawford settled on a farm as his forefathers had done, but not being successful, became a clerk in Sydney and afterwards had a typewriting business. Some of Crawford's poems were published in The Bulletin and other periodicals. Crawford is believed to have been the first prize-winning haiku poet published in Australia, in The Bulletin on 12 August 1899.
In 1904 a small collection, Lyric Moods:Various Verses, was published in Sydney. An enlarged edition was later published in Melbourne retitled simply Lyric Moods (1909). In 1921 another volume, Leafy Bliss, was published, and an enlarged edition appeared three years later.

Not a great deal is known about Crawford; he was short of stature, poetical in spirit. He mixed little in literary circles and seems to be forgotten a few years after his death. The statement that he was educated at The King's School originally appeared in The Bookfellow, and may have come direct from Crawford. If so there is no reason to doubt it, yet in the records of The King's School of his period the only R. Crawford is listed as Richard Crawford. It was also not possible to identify him positively with the Robert James G. W. Crawford who graduated B.A. at the University of Sydney in 1912, when the poet was about 44 years of age. Crawford is represented in some of the anthologies, and A. G. Stephens thought highly of his work. His work has a delicate charm and, though at times one fears it will not rise above merely pretty verse, in some of his quatrains and lyrics Crawford does succeed in writing poetry of importance. Perhaps, as Stephens once suggested, he may be better appreciated in the 21st century.

Death 
Crawford died suddenly at Lindfield, Sydney, on 13 January 1930.

Poetry collections 

 Lyric Moods : Various Verses (1904)
 Lyric Moods (1909)
 ''The Leafy Bliss (1921)

References

External links
'Lyric Moods' at the National Library of Australia

1868 births
1930 deaths
People educated at The King's School, Parramatta
19th-century Australian poets
20th-century Australian poets